A list of films produced in the Cinema of Austria in the 2000s decade  ordered by year of release. For an alphabetical list of articles on Austrian films see :Category:Austrian films.

In cases of international co-productions, films in the making of which an Austrian studio was the majority partner (with a foreign film studio as a co-producer with a minority interest) are indicated by "(maj.)" in the "Notes" column. Films in the making of which an Austrian studio was the minority partner (with a foreign film studio as a co-producer with a majority interest) are indicated by "(min.)" in the "Notes" column.

The dates in parentheses are the start dates of film runs in Austrian cinemas.

2000–2003

2004 

In 2004, 24 Austrian films were produced either as solely Austrian productions, or with an Austrian majority interest and opened in the cinemas. 16 were feature films and 8 were documentary films. A further 8 films were produced with an Austrian minority production interest, 7 of them feature films: for example Michael Haneke's Wolfzeit, which is a predominantly French production.

2005 

In 2005, 24 Austrian films were produced either as solely Austrian productions, or with an Austrian majority interest and opened in the cinemas. 15 of them were documentary films, and nine were feature films. A further six films (three documentary films and three feature films) were produced with an Austrian minority interest co-production partner – for example, the award-winning documentary Darwin's Nightmare, a production with a majority French interest.

2006

In 2006, 34 Austrian films were produced and opened in the cinemas. All of them were either solely Austrian productions, or had an Austrian majority interest. 17 of them were documentary films and 16 were feature films.

2007

In 2007, 34 Austrian films (19 documentary films and 15 feature films, including the two feature films Winterreise and Deepfrozen, which are mentioned on the website of the Film Institute, but not in the Film Report) were first screened in Austrian cinemas, 25 of them either solely Austrian productions, or with an Austrian majority interest (the latter including 7 feature films). 9 films were produced with an Austrian studio as the minority co-production partner, 8 of them feature films – for example Hans Weingartner's Reclaim Your Brain, which is a production with a majority German interest.

2008

In 2008, 33 Austrian films were first screened in Austrian cinemas (20 feature films, 13 documentary films), 28 of them either solely Austrian productions, or with an Austrian majority interest (source: Austrian Film Institute)

2009

In 2009, 34 Austrian films were first screened in Austrian cinemas (17 feature films, 17 documentary films), 28 of them either solely Austrian productions, or with an Austrian majority interest (source: Austrian Film Institute

Sources

External links
 Austrian film at the Internet Movie Database
 Austrianfilm.com

2000
Austrian
Films

de:Liste österreichischer Filme